Veretillidae is a family of sea pens.

References

External links 
 
 eol
 

 
Pennatulacea
Cnidarian families